This chart shows the most common applications of the International Phonetic Alphabet (IPA) to represent English language pronunciations.

See Pronunciation respelling for English for phonetic transcriptions used in different dictionaries.
AmE, American English
AuE, Australian English
BahE, Bahamian English
BarE, Barbadian English
CaE, Canadian English
CIE, Channel Island English
EnE, English English 
FiE, Fiji English
InE, Indian English
IrE, Irish English
JSE, Jamaican English
NZE, New Zealand English
PaE, Palauan English
ScE, Scottish English
SIE, Solomon Islands English
SAE, South African English
SSE, Standard Singapore English
WaE, Welsh English

Chart
This chart gives a partial system of diaphonemes for English. The symbols for the diaphonemes are given in bold, followed by their most common phonetic values. For the vowels, a separate phonetic value is given for each major dialect, and words used to name corresponding lexical sets are also given. The diaphonemes and lexical sets given here are based on RP and General American; they are not sufficient to express all of the distinctions found in other dialects, such as Australian English.

See also
 English phonology
 List of dialects of the English language
 Phonetic alphabets
 Pronunciation respelling for English
 SAMPA chart for English
 Help:IPA/English
 Help:IPA/Conventions for English

Notes

References

 
 
 
 
 
 
 
 
 
 
 
 
 
 
 
 
 

International Phonetic Alphabet
English phonology
Language comparison